The George Washington Baker House, at 115 N. 100 West in Mendon, Utah, was built in 1869.  It was listed on the National Register of Historic Places in 1983.

It has a six-bay facade with two front doors.

Its NRHP nomination describes it as having "Double-Pen Type" architecture, but this is perhaps not in the same sense that the term double pen architecture is used to describe early log homes in Kentucky and other states.

References

		
National Register of Historic Places in Cache County, Utah
Houses completed in 1869